The following is a list of Nippon Professional Baseball players with the last name starting with S, retired or active.

S

Takuma Sadaoka
Hideki Saeki
Takahiro Saeki
Hajime Saito
Hidemitsu Saitoh
Kazumi Saito
Manabu Saito
Masaki Saito
Mitsugu Saitoh
Mitsuhiro Saitoh
Shinsuke Saitoh
Shogo Saitoh
Takashi Saito
Takayuki Saitoh
Toshio Saitoh
Yuki Saito
Masashi Sajikihara
Katsuhiko Saka
Tomotaka Sakaguchi
Daisuke Sakai
Hiroki Sakai
Junya Sakai
Mitsujiro Sakai
Tadaharu Sakai
Tsutomu Sakai
Yasushi Sakai
Hayato Sakamoto
Ryuichi Sakamoto
Takuya Sakamoto
Yataro Sakamoto
Masami Sakohata
Hirokazu Sakuma
Masahiro Sakumoto
Kodai Sakurai
Shinichi Sakurai
Yoshimi Sakurai
Yukihiro Sakurai
Keiichi Sakuta
Hideki Samejima
Hiroki Sanada
Anthony Sanders
Scott Sanders
Kazunari Sanematsu
Shigeki Sano
Takahide Sano
Julio Santana
Hiroshi Santoh
Takashi Sasagawa
Akiyoshi Sasaki
Katsutoshi Sasaki
Kazuhiro Sasaki
Kiyoshi Sasaki
Kyosuke Sasaki
Makoto Sasaki
Shigeki Sasaki
Shinji Sasaoka
Youichi Sasayama
Kenta Satake
Manabu Satake
Takahiko Sato
Hideki Satoh
Hiroshi Satoh
Hiroyuki Satoh
Kazuhiro Satoh
Kenji Sato
Kosuke Satoh
Makoto Satoh
Masaru Satoh
Mitsuru Satoh
Reinaldo Sato
Ryota Satoh
Sadaharu Satoh
Shinichi Sato
Shoma Sato (baseball, born 1989)
Takeshi Satoh
Tomoaki Satoh
Tomoki Satoh
Tsuyoshi Satoh
Yasuyuki Satoh
Yoshihiro Satoh
Yoshinori Sato - born 1954
Yoshinori Sato - born 1989
Yukihiko Satoh
Tomoya Satozaki
Tsuyoshi Sawada
Michihisa Sawai
Ryosuke Sawai
Eiji Sawamura
Toshikazu Sawazaki
Tomoya Sayashi
Erik Schullstrom
Mike Schultz
Scott Seabol
Chris Seelbach
Fernando Seguignol
Kiyokazu Seki
Iori Sekiguchi
Seiji Sekiguchi
Yuta Sekiguchi
Koichi Sekikawa
Kentaro Sekimoto
Hiroyuki Sekine
Junzo Sekine
Tomoyoshi Sekiya
Masato Sekiyoshi
Bill Selby
Norbert Semanaka da Hossha
Kensaku Senoo
Yoshihiro Seo
Dan Serafini
Yuji Serizawa
Terunobu Seto
Andy Sheets
Scott Sheldon
Hiroshi Shibahara - born 1969
Hiroshi Shibahara - born 1974
Minoru Shibahara
Hiroshi Shibakusa
Kazuhiro Shibasaki
Hiroyuki Shibata
Kazuya Shibata
Masaya Shibata
Ryosuke Shibata
Tomohide Shichino
Munehiro Shida
Takumi Shiigi
Motohiro Shima
Shigenobu Shima
Akihiro Shimada
Kazuteru Shimada
Naoya Shimada
Ikki Shimamura
Yasuhito Shimao
Tetsuya Shimata
Shinya Shimawaki
Takeshi Shimazaki
Akinobu Shimizu
Akio Shimizu
Kiyohito Shimizu
Masaji Shimizu
Masaumi Shimizu
Naoyuki Shimizu
Takashi Shimizu
Takayuki Shimizu
Yoshiyuki Shimizu
Yosuke Shimokubo
Yuta Shimoshikiryo
Makoto Shimoyama
Shinji Shimoyama
Tsuyoshi Shimoyanagi
Tatsuya Shimozono
Ayahito Shinada
Kansuke Shinada
Minoru Shindoh
Tatsuya Shindoh
Tsuyoshi Shinjo
Junpei Shinoda
Takayuki Shinohara
Hiroshi Shintani
Ken Shinzato
Shoya Shinzato
Tatsuya Shiokawa
Kazuhiko Shiotani
Daisuke Shioya
Makoto Shiozaki
Tetsuya Shiozaki
Yuta Shirahama
Kazuyuki Shirai
Yasukatsu Shirai
Katsumi Shiraishi
Daisuke Shirakawa
Hirokazu Shiranita
Katsushi Shirasaka
Yoshihisa Shiratake
Hironori Shiratori
Masaki Shiratori
Noriyuki Shiroishi
Itsuki Shoda
Kozo Shoda
Takahiro Shoda
Daisuke Shoji
Rick Short
Eiji Shotsu
Brian Shouse
Jeff Schwarz
Brian Sikorski
Randall Simon
Matt Skrmetta
Terrmel Sledge
Mark Smith
Kota Soejima
Naoki Sogabe
Takatomi Sogawa
Yuji Sogawa
Katsuo Soh
Shunyo Soh
Kensaku Someda
Shawn Sonnier
Kazumi Sonokawa
Alfonso Soriano
Eishin Soyogi
Shane Spencer
Matt Stairs
Jason Standridge
Rob Stanifer
Victor Starffin
Lee Stevens
Josh Stewart
Yutaka Sudoh
Godai Suehiro
Masafumi Suenaga
Masashi Suenaga
Yo Sugihara
Kiyohiko Sugimoto
Masato Sugimoto
Naofumi Sugimoto
Yu Sugimoto
Shigeru Sugishita
Isamu Sugita
Toshiya Sugiuchi
Kiyoshi Sugiura
Tadashi Sugiura
Haruki Sugiyama
Kento Sugiyama
Naohisa Sugiyama
Naoki Sugiyama
Shunsuke Sugiyama
Hironori Suguro
Mitsuo Sumi
Ginjiro Sumitani
Hayato Sumitomo
Yoshinori Sumiyoshi
Dong-Yeol Sun
Hideki Sunaga
Kuninobu Sunaoshi
Yuki Suzue
Atsushi Suzuki

Fumihiro Suzuki
Hiroki Suzuki
Ichiro Suzuki
Keishi Suzuki
Ken Suzuki - born 1969
Ken Suzuki - born 1970
Makoto Suzuki - born 1975
Makoto Suzuki - born 1985
Masamitsu Suzuki
Nozomu Suzuki
Taira Suzuki
Takahiro Suzuki
Takahisa Suzuki
Takanori Suzuki
Takeyuki Suzuki
Tetsu Suzuki
Yoshihiro Suzuki - born 1963
Yoshihiro Suzuki - born 1983
Brian Sweeney

References

External links
Japanese Baseball

 S